Little Animals is the sixth studio album by the Australian rock band Beasts of Bourbon, released in 2007. A video was released for "I Don't Care About Nothing Anymore". The album was dedicated to Ian Rilen.

Track listing
"I Don't Care About Nothing Anymore" (Brian Hooper, Charlie Owen, Tex Perkins)
"I Am Gone" (Owen, Spencer P. Jones, Perkins, Tony Pola)
"I Told You So" (Hooper, Owen, Jones)
"Master and Slave" (Perkins)
"Little Animals" (Jones, Perkins)
"The Beast I Came to Be" (Jones)
"Sleepwalker" (Jones, Perkins, Pola)
"Too Much Too Late" (Hooper, Owen, Perkins)
"New Day of the Dead" (Jones)
"Thanks" (Jones)

Personnel
The Beasts of Bourbon
Tex Perkins - vocals
Charlie Owen - guitar 
Spencer P. Jones - guitar
Brian Hooper - bass
Tony Pola - drums

References

2007 albums
Beasts of Bourbon albums